Prince Ibrahim Fareed Didi was a younger son of Sultan Abdul Majeed Didi and Princess consort Famuladeyrige Didi. He was the brother of King Muhammad Fareed Didi of Maldives.

He served as the speaker of People's Majlis from 1954 to 1959.

In 1982, he was appointed as acting Minister of Justice.

References

External links
"Previous Speakers", People's Majlis, majlis.gov.mv
Maldivian nobility
Speakers of the People's Majlis
Date of birth missing
Year of birth missing